Margus Tabor (born 13 May 1962, in Suuremõisa) is an Estonian actor.

He is a member of the Estonian Theatre Union (since 1987) and the Estonian Actors' Union (since 1993).

Tabor has been married to actress Garmen Tabor since 1989.

Selected roles

Selected film roles
 1988 Õnnelik lapsepõlv 
 1989 Mardipäev 
 2010	Punane elavhõbe (feature film; role: 1st taxi driver)
 2011	Lotte ja kuukivi saladus (animation film; role: Rännukoer Klaus (voice))
 2012	Allveelennud	(feature film; role: voices)
 2018	Kapten Morten lollide laeval (animation film; role: Matilda/Tilda (voice))
 2019	Lotte ja kadunud lohed (animation film; role: Harald (voice))
 2019	Truth and Justice (feature film; role: Herman)
 2020	The SpongeBob Movie: Sponge on the Run

References

Living people
1962 births
Estonian male film actors
Estonian male stage actors
Estonian male television actors
Estonian male voice actors
Estonian television presenters
Estonian Academy of Music and Theatre alumni
People from Hiiumaa Parish
21st-century Estonian male actors